Jacques Garcia, (born 25 September 1947) is a French architect, interior designer and garden designer, best known for his contemporary interiors of Paris hotels and restaurants.

Biography

Born in 1947, Jacques Garcia showed a talent for drawing and objects of art at a young age. At the age of eight, he constructed and furnished his first structure at the home of grandparents.  Thereafter he attended a school of interior design and completed his education in the applied arts.

When he finished his education, he began working for a firm of contemporary architects, and created the concepts for the interiors of the Tour Montparnasse in Paris, Le Méridien hotels, and the Royal Monceau à Paris.  He was also the interior architect for the Hôtel Costes and Costes restaurants, the Hotel Majestic, and the restaurant Fouquet's. In 2006, he redecorated the Hôtel Odéon Saint Germain in Paris.,  He purchased and restored the Château du Champ-de-Bataille in Normandy and undertook to recreate and update the large French formal garden.

He also became an avid collector of furniture and royal art objects dispersed after the French Revolution.  Since 1992 he is the owner of the Château du Champ-de-Bataille.

For his achievements, he was named commander of the Order of Arts and Letters, and a Chevalier in the order of the Légion d'honneur.

Works
Le Style à La Traviata, by Jacques Garcia and Henry-Jean Servat, published by Albin Michel
L'Éloge du décor by Jacques Garcia and Franck Ferrand, édited par Flammarion
 Moderne by Jacques Garcia et Frank Ferrand, published by Gallimard

Sources

Bibliography
Jacques Garcia by Franck Ferrand, published by Flammarion.
Jacques Garcia : ou L'Éloge du décor by Franck Ferrand.

Filmography
Jacques Garcia, gentleman décorateur (52mn), by Francis Blaise.

External links
Château du Champ-de-Bataille blog article in French with many photos, including aerial views of the grounds
Château du Champ de Bataille (French)
Château du Champ de Bataille at the Committee of Parks and Gardens of the French Ministry of Culture

20th-century French architects
French interior designers
French landscape architects
Living people
1947 births
Architects from Paris
Commandeurs of the Ordre des Arts et des Lettres
Commandeurs of the Légion d'honneur